Jürgen Rumrich (born 20 March 1968) is a German former ice hockey player. He competed in the men's tournaments at the 1992 Winter Olympics, the 1998 Winter Olympics and the 2002 Winter Olympics.

Career statistics

Regular season and playoffs

International

References

External links
 

1968 births
Living people
Olympic ice hockey players of Germany
Ice hockey players at the 1992 Winter Olympics
Ice hockey players at the 1998 Winter Olympics
Ice hockey players at the 2002 Winter Olympics
People from Miesbach (district)
Sportspeople from Upper Bavaria